{{Speciesbox
| image = Orkideo1.jpg
| genus = Encyclia
| species = flava
| authority = (Lindl.) Porto & Brade
| synonyms =
 Epidendrum flavum Lindl. (Basionym)
 Epidendrum amictum Linden & Rchb.f.
 Epidendrum conchichilum Barb.Rodr.
 Epidendrum linearifolioides Kraenzl.
 Encyclia amicta (Linden & Rchb.f.) Schltr.
 Encyclia conchichila (Barb.Rodr.) Porto & Brade
 Encyclia linearifolioides (Kraenzl.) Hoehne
 Encyclia bicornuta Brade
 Encyclia linearifolioides var. fuscosepala (Hoehne) Hoehne
 Encyclia microxanthina 
}}Encyclia flava is a species of orchid found in South America.

The diploid chromosome number of E. flava has been determined as 2n'' = 40.

Footnotes and external links 

flava
Orchids of South America